Katherine Dinah "Goldie" Sayers (born 16 July 1982), is a former British javelin thrower, who won a bronze medal at the 2008 Summer Olympics. She was born in Newmarket, Suffolk, United Kingdom. Sayers set the record when competing for her university, Loughborough, at the Loughborough International match. She cemented this achievement at the Norwich Union Glasgow Grand Prix on 3 June 2007 where she beat a top-class international field in rainy conditions with a throw of 63.59 m. Defeated rivals included European champion and Olympic silver medallist Steffi Nerius and world champion Barbora Špotáková.

Early life
Sayers was educated at Fairstead House School, Newmarket, and at The King's School, Ely. She played hockey, netball and tennis at county level, and was an under 11 national table tennis champion.

Career highlights

Sayers first came to prominence when setting national junior records and winning national titles, in 2001. Sayers also served as the captain of Great Britain's women's under 20 team, this season. The following season, Sayers finished in sixth place at the Commonwealth Games.

From 2003 to 2007, Sayers won five consecutive national titles but had limited success at major championships, failing to make the final at her first Olympics in 2004 and finishing twelfth at both the 2005 World Championships and 2006 European Championships but she did finish fifth at the 2006 Commonwealth Games.

The early 2007 season boded well for Sayers, setting two UK records and defeating high-class rivals, such as Germany's European champion Steffi Nerius and the Czech Republic's Barbora Špotáková, who went on to win the world title that season, at a championship where Sayers finished 18th in qualifying, with her worst result of the season: 57.23 m.

On 15 March 2008 Sayers won the European Cup of Winter Throwing title in Split, Croatia, with a throw of 63.65 m.

Sayers originally finished fourth at the 2008 Summer Olympics in Beijing, China, setting a new British record of 65.75 m. However in 2016 the Russian third placed athlete, Mariya Abakumova, tested positive for banned substances after a re-analysis of her sample, meaning that Sayers would be upgraded to the bronze medal position. She eventually received her Olympic bronze medal on 20 July 2019 at the London Anniversary Games, 11 years later.

She improved her British record to 66.17m at the London Grand Prix Diamond League meeting in London in 2012.

On 4 July 2012, Sayers carried the Olympic Torch through Bourne in Lincolnshire.

On 7 August 2012, Sayers competed in the women's javelin at the 2012 Summer Olympics, but had sustained an injury to her right arm and was unable to feel her throwing hand. She threw three attempts but failed to throw the qualification distance and so stepped over the line and was knocked out of the competition without recording a mark.

Sayers subsequently had elbow surgery which involved a ligament being removed from her right wrist and inserted in her left arm. She lost her funding from UK Athletics at the end of 2014, but philanthropist Barrie Wells agreed to fund Sayers' training in exchange for helping heptathlete Katarina Johnson-Thompson improve her javelin throwing.

International competitions

Personal life
Sayers' father, Pete Sayers, who died in 2005, was a bluegrass musician and the first Englishman to appear at the Grand Ole Opry.

References

External links
 
 

1982 births
Living people
People from Newmarket, Suffolk
Sportspeople from Suffolk
English female javelin throwers
British female javelin throwers
Olympic female javelin throwers
Olympic athletes of Great Britain
Athletes (track and field) at the 2004 Summer Olympics
Athletes (track and field) at the 2008 Summer Olympics
Athletes (track and field) at the 2012 Summer Olympics
Commonwealth Games competitors for England
Athletes (track and field) at the 2006 Commonwealth Games
Athletes (track and field) at the 2014 Commonwealth Games
World Athletics Championships athletes for Great Britain
British Athletics Championships winners
AAA Championships winners
Alumni of Loughborough University
People educated at King's Ely